Joseph McMurray Devine (March 15, 1861August 31, 1938) was an American politician who was the Governor of North Dakota from 1898 to 1899. He served as governor for less than one year as he finished the term after Governor Frank A. Briggs died in office.

Biography
Joseph M. Devine was born in Wheeling (in modern-day West Virginia; located in Virginia at the time of his birth). He was educated in the public schools. He received a B.A. degree from the West Virginia University in 1881.  He married Ida Frances Holloway in 1891 and they had one daughter.  He was again married, in 1900, to Mary Bernadine Hascom; and had a son, Douglas, and two daughters, Helen and Bernadine.  He moved to LaMoure County, Dakota Territory in 1884 and was superintendent of schools for ten years. In 1892 he lost an election for state superintendent of public education to Laura J. Eisenhuth, the first woman elected to state office in the United States.

Career
He first entered politics as Lieutenant Governor of North Dakota in 1897. When Governor Frank A. Briggs died on August 9, 1898, Devine, assumed the duties of governorship for the remainder of the term. He won reelection as Lieutenant Governor from 1899 through 1901 He continued to be active in educational issues, serving as the North Dakota Superintendent of Public Instruction from 1901-1902. In 1914, he became executive head of the State Training School in Mandan. The last position he held was as State Immigration Commissioner from 1923 to 1933.

Death
Devine died of heart failure on August 31, 1938, and is interred in Mandan Union Cemetery in Mandan, North Dakota.

References

External links
 
Biography for Joseph M. Devine from the State Historical Society of North Dakota website.
National Governors Association

Devine Joseph M.
Devine Joseph M.
Devine Joseph M.
Devine Joseph M.
North Dakota Superintendents of Public Instruction
American Presbyterians
North Dakota Republicans
Republican Party governors of North Dakota
Politicians from Wheeling, West Virginia
People from LaMoure County, North Dakota
19th-century American politicians
20th-century American politicians
People born in the Confederate States